Sascut is a commune in Bacău County, Western Moldavia, Romania. It is composed of seven villages: Berești, Conțești, Păncești, Sascut, Sascut-Sat, Schineni, and Valea Nacului.

Natives
 Teodor Negoiță (1947–2011), polar explorer
 Valerian Stan (born 1955), military officer, publicist, and human rights activist

References

Communes in Bacău County
Localities in Western Moldavia